Jay White (born 1992) is a New Zealand professional wrestler.

Jay White may also refer to:

 Jay White (impersonator), Canadian impersonator
 Jay White House, single-family home in Lapeer, Michigan, U.S.

See also
 White (surname)